The Kirschbraun and Sons Creamery is located at 901 Dodge Street in Downtown Omaha, Nebraska.

It is a brick five-story commercial style warehouse with terra cotta details and an elaborate main entrance.  The brickwork is simple brown bricks laid in running bond.

References

Warehouses on the National Register of Historic Places
Buildings and structures in Omaha, Nebraska
National Register of Historic Places in Omaha, Nebraska
Industrial buildings and structures on the National Register of Historic Places in Nebraska
Early Commercial architecture in the United States
Buildings and structures completed in 1917